Nexbank is a privately-held state-chartered bank, supervised by the FDIC, that provides financial services in institutional banking, commercial banking, and mortgage banking. It is headquartered in Dallas, Texas, where it has three branches. Its parent is NexBank Capital, Inc., a financial services company. As of 2022 NexBank had assets of almost $14 billon and was "the largest privately held bank in Texas."

History
The bank was founded in 1922 as Terrell Federal Savings and Loan Association, a community bank located in Terrell, Texas, and became a mutual savings bank in 1999, when it changed its name to Heritage Savings Bank, SSB. It became a stock savings bank in 2002 and shortened its name to Heritage Bank, SSB. The bank moved to Dallas in 2004, after it was acquired by partners in Highland Capital, and changed its name to NexBank, SSB, in 2005. It acquired Princeton Savings Bank in Princeton, New Jersey, in 2015 and changed to a commercial bank in 2020, when it changed its name to NexBank.

References

Banks based in Texas
American companies established in 1922
Banks established in 1922
1922 establishments in Texas
Companies based in Dallas